China Northwest Airlines Flight 2119 (WH2119) was a flight from Yinchuan Xihuayuan Airport, Ningxia to Beijing Capital International Airport, People's Republic of China. On July 23, 1993, the aircraft crashed into a lake after it was unable to get airborne while attempting to take off at Yinchuan Airport, killing 54 passengers and 1 crew member on board.

Accident
Just before rotation on takeoff, the right-side flap actuator failed, causing the flaps to retract. Unable to get the aircraft into the air, the crew had no other option but to abort the takeoff. This failed however, the nose gear lifted off causing the tail to strike the runway. The aircraft then overran the runway and crashed into a lake.

Cause 
It was suspected that the crew failed to check if the flaps were deployed properly for takeoff.

See also
List of accidents and incidents involving commercial aircraft

References 

Airliner accidents and incidents caused by mechanical failure
Aviation accidents and incidents in 1993
Accidents and incidents involving the British Aerospace 146
Aviation accidents and incidents in China
China Northwest Airlines accidents and incidents
1993 disasters in China
July 1993 events in Asia